Paulo André Vilaça Cunha (born 19 February 1986) is a Portuguese football player who plays for Varzim.

Club career
He made his professional debut in the Segunda Liga for Varzim on 21 September 2016 in a game against Olhanense.

References

1986 births
People from Vila Nova de Famalicão
Living people
Portuguese footballers
SC Vianense players
G.D. Ribeirão players
F.C. Tirsense players
Varzim S.C. players
Liga Portugal 2 players
Association football goalkeepers
Sportspeople from Braga District